The Djupfjord Bridge is a bridge that crosses the Djupfjorden in Moskenes Municipality in Nordland county, Norway. It was opened on 3 June 2003 and replaced an older bridge at the same place. The building of the bridge took two years, which was longer than planned, due to problems with the strong current in the fjord, waves and wind.

The old Djupfjord Bridge was a suspension bridge, and was built in 1959.

See also
List of bridges in Norway
List of bridges in Norway by length
List of bridges
List of bridges by length

References

Road bridges in Nordland
Bridges completed in 2003
Bridges completed in 1959
2003 establishments in Norway
1959 establishments in Norway
Suspension bridges in Norway
European route E10 in Norway
Roads within the Arctic Circle
Moskenes